Anakao or Anokao is a coastal fishing town, somewhere on the southwest coast of Madagascar, 35 kilometres south of Toliara. It belongs to the municipality of Ambolofoty. It is located southwest of Soalara. It is inhabited by the Vezo people and is a notable resort getaway, containing the Club Resort Anakao, Anakao Ocean Lodge, Prince Anakao, and Chez Emile hotels. There are some tombs located near the point of the town. The topography is described as "rather flat, except where the sandy soil forms dunes." To the south are the villages of Ankilimivony and Ankiririsa.

References

External links

Video (French)
Madacamp/Anakao

Populated coastal places in Madagascar
Populated places in Atsimo-Andrefana